Damoh railway station is a railway station serving Damoh city, in Damoh district of Madhya Pradesh. Damoh is a 'A' Category railway station of West Central Railway Zone of Indian Railways. Its code is DMO. It serves Damoh city. The station consists of three platforms. Passenger, Express and Superfast trains halt here.

Major trains

The following trains originate from Damoh railway station:

 Bhopal–Damoh Rajya Rani Express
 Damoh–Bina Passenger
 Damoh-Kota passenger

References

Railway stations in Damoh district
Jabalpur railway division